Berke Özer (born 25 May 2000) is a Turkish professional footballer who plays as a goalkeeper for Ümraniyespor on loan from Eyüpspor.

Club career
Fenerbahçe signed in Berke Özer along with his team-mate Barış Alıcı from Altınordu, on 10 July 2018, with an altogether €4 million transfer fee. Özer was excluded from 23-player-squad submitted for group stage of 2018–19 UEFA Europa League Group D fixtures. On 6 December 2018, Özer made his debut for Fenerbahçe against Giresunspor in 1st leg encounter of 5th round at 2018–19 Turkish Cup where he earned a clean sheet, following the final score of 1–0.

On 20 July 2019, Özer joined Belgian First Division B outfit Westerlo on loan for 2019–20 season. On 3 August 2019, he made his debut against Lommel SK on Belgian First Division B encounter which ended 2–0 in favour of Westerlo. On 14 August 2019, he was selected at Team of the Week following home game against Oud-Heverlee Leuven, ending 1–0 for Westerlo's favour at week 2. Following two back-to-back clean sheets, he conceded for his first time in league at week 3 home game up against K.S.V. Roeselare that ended 4–1 in favour of Westerlo on 17 August 2019.

Özer made his Süper Lig debut with Fenerbahçe in a 2–1 away defeat to Konyaspor on 30 October 2021, entering as a substitute in the 72nd minute after Altay Bayındır's shoulder injury.

On 17 January 2023, Özer signed a 2.5-year contract with Eyüpspor. On the same day, he joined Ümraniyespor on loan for the rest of the 2022–23 season.

International career
In 2017 June, Özer was called up to Turkey national team by then-coach Fatih Terim for the friendly game to be held against Macedonia.

Career statistics

Club

1.Includes Turkish Cup and Belgian Cup
2.Includes UEFA Champions League and UEFA Europa League.
3.Includes Turkish Super Cup.

Honours
Turkey U-17
 UEFA European Under-17 Championship (semi-finalist): 2017

References

2000 births
Living people
Sportspeople from İzmir
Turkish footballers
Association football goalkeepers
Turkey youth international footballers
Competitors at the 2018 Mediterranean Games
Mediterranean Games competitors for Turkey
Altınordu F.K. players
Fenerbahçe S.K. footballers
K.V.C. Westerlo players
Portimonense S.C. players
Eyüpspor footballers
Ümraniyespor footballers
TFF First League players
Süper Lig players
Challenger Pro League players
Turkish expatriate footballers
Turkish expatriate sportspeople in Belgium
Expatriate footballers in Belgium
Turkish expatriate sportspeople in Portugal
Expatriate footballers in Portugal